Province 6 (VI), also called the Province of the Northwest, is one of nine ecclesiastical provinces making up the Episcopal Church in the United States of America. It is composed of eight dioceses, one for each of the eight states of Colorado, Iowa, Minnesota, Montana, Nebraska, North Dakota, South Dakota, and Wyoming. (The boundaries of some dioceses are slightly different from the corresponding states, however.) Brian Prior of the Diocese of Minnesota serves as President and Lelanda Lee of the Diocese of Colorado serves as Vice President.

Dioceses of Province VI

Diocese of Colorado
Diocese of Iowa
Diocese of Minnesota
Diocese of Montana
Diocese of Nebraska
Diocese of North Dakota
Diocese of South Dakota
Diocese of Wyoming

Ecclesiastical provinces of the Episcopal Church in the United States of America